Chiarissimo Falconieri Mellini (25 September 1794 – 22 August 1859) was a Catholic Cardinal and Camerlengo of the Sacred College of Cardinals.

Early life and priesthood
Mellini was born on 25 September 1794 in Rome, the son of Marquis Alessandro Falconieri Mellini and Marianna Lante Montefeltro della Rovere, of the dukes of Bomarzo. He was a relative of Cardinals Lelio Falconieri (1643) and Alessandro Falconieri (1724). His great-great-grandfather was Duke Ippolito Lante Montefeltro della Rovere.

He was educated at the Collegio Tolomei in Siena, the Collegio Romano in Rome and the La Sapienza University in Rome where he received a doctorate in utroque iuris (both civil and canon law) in 1824. Mellini was ordained on 19 September 1818 and was named an Auditor of the Sacred Roman Rota.

Episcopate and cardinalate
He was elected Archbishop of Ravenna and was consecrated in 1826 by Pope Leo XII.

Mellini was elevated to cardinal-priest in the consistory of 12 February 1838. He participated in the Papal Conclave of 1846 which elected Pope Pius IX and was made Secretary of Memorials in 1857. Mellini was appointed Camerlengo of the Sacred College of Cardinals in 1859.

Death
Mellini died on 22 August 1859 at Ravenna and was exposed and buried in the Metropolitan Cathedral of Ravenna.

See also

Vatican
College of Cardinals
Catholic Church

References

1794 births
1859 deaths
Archbishops of Ravenna
Cardinals created by Pope Gregory XVI